Ruddedy Baba is the second album by Ruggedman, it was released in  2007.

Track listing
"Naija Hip Hop 101, Pt 1 (Intro)" 
"Move Sunthin 4 Me" 
"Watch Me" 
"Club Rugged" 
"World Chart Show (Skit)" 
"Ruggedy Baba (featuring 9ice)" 
"My Life" 
" Ja Rule (Skit)" 
"Waka"
"To Whom It May Concern" 
"Gangsta #1 (Skit)" 
"Won't Battle (featuring C'Mion)" 
"Touched By An Angel" 
"If I Could Do It All (featuring Niyola)" 
"Let Me Touch You (featuring George Nathaniel)" 
"Flesh 2 Flesh ..2 Death" 
"Broken Promise"
"Rock Da Spot (featuring Lord Of Ajasa)"
"Jusile (featuring Durella)"
"Boing Boing (featuring Mr Skillz & Stylo G)"
"Naija Hip Hop 101, Pt 2 (Outro)"

External links 
Official Website

2007 albums
Ruggedman albums